José Gea Escolano (14 June 1929 – 6 February 2017) was a Spanish Roman Catholic prelate.

Born in El Real de Gandia, Gea Escolano was ordained to the priesthood in 1953. He served as the Bishop of Ibiza from 1976 to 1987, and later as the Bishop of Mondoñedo-Ferrol from 1987 until his retirement in 2005. He died on 6 February 2017 in Valencia at the age of 87.

References

1929 births
2017 deaths
People from Gandia
20th-century Roman Catholic bishops in Spain
21st-century Roman Catholic bishops in Spain